The Barrhorn is a mountain in the Pennine Alps.

Access roads and normal climbing route
The only access road is from the north, from the Turtmann village in the Rhona valley. From there, take direction to Gruben, and after passing it drive up to Vorder Sänntum at 1900 m. You will come to the point where the public road ends up, there is a formal parking that costs 4 CHF per day.

From the car parking to the summit you may get in less than 5 hours, and from the Turtmann hut to the summit in about 3 hours. You do not need any special equipment, this is a simple walk up.

References

External links 
 Barrhorn in Mountains for Everybody.

Mountains of the Alps
Alpine three-thousanders
Mountains of Valais
Mountains of Switzerland